Kirsch is a fruit brandy.

Kirsch may also refer to:
 Kirsch equations
 Kirsch (surname), a surname (and list of people with the name)
 Kirsch (Longuich), a part of Longuich, Rhineland-Palatinate, Germany